No. 2 Patrick Street is the second studio album by the Irish folk band Patrick Street, released in 1988 on Green Linnet Records.

Recording
It was recorded at Homestead Studios Dublin, Ireland, produced by the band and engineered by Enda Walsh, then remixed at Landsdowne Studios, also in Dublin, by Dónal Lunny and Andrew Boland.

The founding members Andy Irvine, Kevin Burke, Jackie Daly and Arty McGlynn were joined by Walsh on keyboards.

Track listing
All tracks Traditional; arranged by Patrick Street; except where indicated
 "John McKenna's Jigs" – 3:49 
 "Braes of Moneymore" (song) (words: Traditional; music: Patrick Street) – 3:49 
 "Hard By Seifin" (Roche Collection of Traditional Irish Music) / "Woodcock Hill" – 3:27 
 "Tom Joad" (song) (Woody Guthrie; new music: Andy Irvine) – 5:56 
 "Benton's Jig" (Jackie Daly) / "Benton's Dream" – 3:41
 "William Taylor" (song) (Traditional; arranged by Patrick Street and Bill Whelan) – 3:08 
 "Carherlistrane Jig"/"Gallowglass Jig"/"Kanturk Jig" (Jackie Daly) Copyright Control – 3:32 
 "Jenny Picking Cockles"/"An Gabhrán"/"Jack Keane's Reel" – 3:33 
 "Facing The Chair" (song) (Andy Irvine) Published by Andy Irvine – 5:16 
 "Sweeney's Reel" (Jackie Daly) Copyright Control – 2:52

Personnel
 Andy Irvine - vocals, mandolin, bouzouki, harmonica
 Kevin Burke - fiddle
 Jackie Daly - accordion
 Arty McGlynn - guitar
 Enda Walsh - keyboards

References

External links
No. 2 Patrick Street at Allmusic website
No. 2 Patrick Street at MusicBrainz website
No. 2 Patrick Street at Discogs website
Patrick Street at Adastra website

1988 albums
Patrick Street albums